FC Malatia, is a defunct Armenian football club from the capital Yerevan. The club was dissolved in 2002 and is currently inactive from professional football.

League record

References

 
Malatia
2002 disestablishments in Armenia
Association football clubs disestablished in 2002